Fadejewobdella is a genus of annelids belonging to the family Erpobdellidae.

The species of this genus are found in Eastern Europe.

Species:

Fadejewobdella quinqueannulata

References

Annelids